Aguilera (e. 2546 m/8353 ft.) is a stratovolcano in southern Chile, which rises above the edge of the Southern Patagonian Ice Field. It is a remote volcano that was identified as such in 1985, but the first ascent only occurred in 2014, making it the last unclimbed major Andean volcano.

It is located west of Lake Argentino and northeast of Peel Fjord in the southern Andes and erupted mainly dacites and pyroclastic tephra. It has erupted several times in the Holocene, with a major eruption taking place 3,000 ± 1,000 years before present. Its eruptions have spread ashfalls over Patagonia.

Geography and geomorphology 

Aguilera lies west of the city of Calafate, northwest of Peel Fjord and within the commune of Natales. There is not much knowledge on volcanism in southernmost Chile/Patagonia as the volcanoes are poorly mapped, difficult to access and the weather conditions hostile. Aguilera was named in 1933 by Alberto Maria de Agostini, but its volcanic nature was first established in 1985.

Aguilera is part of the Andean Austral Volcanic Zone, which lies in the southernmost territory of Chile. It consists of six volcanoes, from north to south these are Lautaro, Viedma, Aguilera, Reclus, Monte Burney and Cook; only the first has clearly documented historical activity, in 1959–1960. The first five are located on the South America Plate at increasing distances from the trench, while Cook is on the Scotia Plate and is a complex of lava domes unlike the other volcanoes which are stratovolcanoes.

Geology 

This subduction is responsible for the volcanism in the Austral Volcanic Zone, whereas earthquake activity is low; this is possibly because the subducting plate is too hot and too slow moving.

The basement below Aguilera is of Paleozoic-early Mesozoic age and consists of metamorphic rocks. The volcano sits at the easterly margin of the Patagonian Batholith, a Mesozoic-Cenozoic igneous rock province.

Volcanism occurs along much of the Andes, partly due to the subduction of the Antarctic Plate and partly due to the subduction of the Nazca Plate, in each case beneath the South America Plate. The latter subduction gives rise to the Northern Volcanic Zone, the Central Volcanic Zone and the Southern Volcanic Zone of the Andes, the Austral Volcanic Zone was once considered part of the Southern Volcanic Zone.

Composition 

Aguilera has erupted dacites with intermediate contents of potassium, defining a calc-alkaline suite with adakitic characteristics. Phenocrysts include amphibole, biotite,  clinopyroxene, hornblende and plagioclase; plagioclase and also orthoclase and pyroxene often occur as xenoliths.

Melts of subducted sediment and from the subducting slab give rise to the magmas of Aguilera and other volcanoes of the northern Austral Volcanic Zone, but they are subsequently modified by interactions with the mantle wedge and in the case of Aguilera, Lautaro and Viedma further interaction takes place with the Paleozoic crust.

Climate and vegetation 

Vegetation in the region ranges from Magellanic subpolar forests to semidesert, depending on the amount of moisture available; Nothofagus species form most of the woods, including Nothofagus antarctica, Nothofagus betuloides and Nothofagus pumilio.

Eruption history 

Aguilera erupted during the Holocene, depositing tephra in the region of Lago Argentino and Torres del Paine. The composition of rocks erupted by Aguilera are similar to these from Lautaro and Viedma, and the linkage of specific ash deposits to Aguilera is based mainly on geographical considerations. Other volcanoes have left tephra deposits in the wider region, including Cerro Hudson, Monte Burney and Reclus.

A tephra layer found at archeological sites around Lago Argentino and deposited there 4,091 - 4,566 years before present originated at Aguilera and probably disrupted local human communities. Farther away in Antarctica, a tephra found in Talos Dome and deposited there 4,420 years before present may have originated at this volcano as well.

Another smaller eruption occurred at Aguilera after the A1 event and deposited ash in the Lago Argentino area; the date of its eruption is unknown. There are no known historical eruptions although Aguilera is a candidate volcano for an eruption that occurred in 1886.

A1 eruption 

A major eruption occurred at Aguilera less than 3,596 ± 230 years before present, it was later constrained to have occurred 3,000 ± 100 years before present, and is known as the A1 eruption of Aguilera. It was a large eruption and deposited tephra east of the volcano and as far south as the Strait of Magellan; other Aguilera tephras are less widespread.

Tephra deposits from this eruption have been found in the Cordillera Baguales ( thickness), at Gran Campo Nevado ( thickness), Lago Argentino ( thickness), Lago Cardiel ( thickness), Lago Roca ( thickness), Lake Viedma ( thickness), Brunswick Peninsula ( thickness), Seno Skyring, Torres del Paine National Park ( thickness) and Isla Grande de Tierra del Fuego ( thickness). On Isla Grande de Tierra del Fuego apparently the eruption did not impact human populations to a large degree. Furthermore, a sulfur dioxide-rich layer in ice cores from Talos Dome, Antarctica, dated to 3,600 years before present may have been a consequence of the Aguilera eruption.

First climb 

Aguilera was the last major volcano in the Andes to be climbed, with the first successful attempt occurring in August 2014 by a group of Chilean climbers.

References

Sources 

 
 
 
 
 
 
 

Volcanoes of Magallanes Region
Andean Volcanic Belt
Stratovolcanoes of Chile
Calderas of Chile
Mountains of Magallanes Region
Mountains of Chile
Holocene stratovolcanoes